José Antonio Villanueva Muñoz (born 16 August 1985 in Cartagena, Region of Murcia) is a Spanish footballer who plays for Andorran club UE Sant Julià as a left winger.

External links

1985 births
Living people
Sportspeople from Cartagena, Spain
Spanish footballers
Footballers from the Region of Murcia
Association football wingers
Segunda División B players
Tercera División players
FC Cartagena footballers
Elche CF Ilicitano footballers
CD Puertollano footballers
Orihuela CF players
Lorca Atlético CF players
CD Torrevieja players
Al-Wasl F.C. players
Cypriot First Division players
Ethnikos Achna FC players
COD Meknès players
FC Lusitanos players
UE Sant Julià players
Spanish expatriate footballers
Expatriate footballers in the United Arab Emirates
Expatriate footballers in Cyprus
Expatriate footballers in Morocco
Expatriate footballers in Italy
Expatriate footballers in Andorra
Spanish expatriate sportspeople in the United Arab Emirates
Spanish expatriate sportspeople in Cyprus